Tappan Zee Playhouse, built in 1911 as the Broadway Theater, was a historic theatre located at Nyack in Rockland County, New York. It consisted of an early 20th-century lobby and theatre structure in front and stage house in rear.  The stage house was a large, converted 19th century stable.  It was demolished in April 2004.

It was listed on the National Register of Historic Places in 1983.

References

External links
Cinema Treasures | Tappan Zee Playhouse

Theatres on the National Register of Historic Places in New York (state)
Neoclassical architecture in New York (state)
Demolished theatres in New York (state)
Theatres completed in 1911
Buildings and structures in Rockland County, New York
1911 establishments in New York (state)
National Register of Historic Places in Rockland County, New York
Buildings and structures demolished in 2004